Sporetus seminalis is a species of beetle in the family Cerambycidae. It was described by Bates in 1864.

References

Acanthocinini
Beetles described in 1864